Hotta is a Japanese surname. Notable people with the surname include:

, Japanese model and television personality
, Japanese footballer
, Japanese daimyō
, Japanese daimyō
, Japanese daimyō
, Japanese daimyō
, Japanese daimyō
, Japanese actress
, Japanese botanist
, Japanese footballer
, Japanese manga artist
, Japanese professional wrestler and mixed martial artist

See also
Hotta clan

Japanese-language surnames